Shortacross is a hamlet in the civil parish of Morval in east Cornwall, England, United Kingdom.

References

Hamlets in Cornwall